Keetia koritschoneri is a species of plant in the family Rubiaceae. It is endemic to Tanzania.

References

Endemic flora of Tanzania
koritschoneri
Vulnerable plants
Taxonomy articles created by Polbot
Taxa named by Diane Mary Bridson